Cholodenko is a surname. Notable people with the surname include:
Alan Cholodenko, American-Australian film theorist
Lisa Cholodenko (born 1964), American screenwriter and director of film and television
Marc Cholodenko (born 1950), French writer

See also
 
 Kholodenko

Ukrainian-language surnames